Giovanni Simonetti (1652 – 4 November 1716) was a Swiss architect, builder, and plasterer who was involved in the design of the Jerusalem Church in Berlin.  He constructed the Neue Kirche from 1701 to 1708. He also plastered the stucco ceiling at the Alte Handelsbörse in Leipzig.

References

Swiss architects
1652 births
1716 deaths
People from Berlin